Grant Building may mean:
 Grant Building (Los Angeles)
 Grant Building (Pittsburgh)
 Grant Building (Washington DC)

See also
Grant Hall (disambiguation)